Jim Parkinson (born October 23, 1941, in Oakland, California) is an American type designer in Oakland, California.

Life

Parkinson studied advertising design and painting at the California College of Arts and Crafts in Oakland, graduating in 1963. In 1964, he worked as a lettering artist for Hallmark Cards under Myron McVay with some consultation from Hermann Zapf. Afterwards, Parkinson moved back to Oakland and freelanced as a lettering artist doing work for rock bands (including Creedence Clearwater, Taj Mahal, The Doobie Brothers, Kansas, et al.), sign painting, advertisements, packaging.

In the mid-1970s Dan X. Solo introduced Parkinson to Roger Black who was, at that time, the newly appointed Art Director for Rolling Stone magazine in San Francisco. Black hired Parkinson to design a series of typefaces and redesign the logo for Rolling Stone.

Although Parkinson's lettering sensibility is rooted in old wood type and signage from the 19th century and during the first part of his career he used pen and ink for finished pieces, in 1990 Parkinson put away his pen and ink and embraced digital technology while working for the San Francisco Chronicle, designing fonts.

Parkinson now operates his independent type foundry  in Oakland. His more high-profile clients include Fast Company, Esquire, Billboard, Newsweek, the San Francisco Examiner, and Ringling Bros. and Barnum & Bailey Circus. His font designs have been inspired by lettering and often by the work of William Addison Dwiggins, including adaptations of his Metro and Electra typefaces for the Chronicle and Letterform Archive.

Typefaces
Typefaces designed by Jim Parkinson include:
LfA Aluminia, 2017
Amador, 2004
Amboy, 2001
Antique Condensed No.2, 1995
Avebury, 2005
Azuza, 2001
Balboa, 2001–2003
Balboa Plus, 2015
Benicia, 2003
ITC Bodoni (with Janice Prescott Fishman, Holly Goldsmith, and Sumner Stone), 1994
Bonita, 1996
Cabazon, 2005
FF Catchwords, 1996
Chuck, 2004
Commerce Gothic, 1998
Comrade, 1998
Diablo, 2002
Dreamland, 1999
El Grande, 1998
Fresno, 2001
Generica, 1996
FF Golden Gate Initials, 1996
Hoosier Daddy, 2012
Hotel, 2001
Industrial Gothic,
Jimbo, 1995
Keester
FF Matinee, 1996
Meatball, 2012
Modesto, 2001–2005
Mojo, 1960
Montara, 2002
FF Motel, 1996
Parkinson, 1994
, 2011
Poster, 1993
Pueblo, 1998
Richmond, 2003
ITC Roswell, 1998
Showcard Gothic, 1993
Showcard Moderne, 1995
Sutro, 2003-2004
Sutro Deluxe, 2014
Wigwag, 2001

Nameplates

Parkinson has designed and cleaned up numerous newspaper and magazine nameplates, making subtle adjustments to letterforms and character spacing to improve their appearance and legibility. Redesigned nameplates include The Washington Post, The Wall Street Journal, Houston Chronicle, New Zealand Herald and Los Angeles Times daily newspapers; Rolling Stone, Esquire, Fast Company and Newsweek magazines; The Daily Californian college newspaper at the University of California, Berkeley; and alternative weeklies Santa Cruz Weekly, North Bay Bohemian and Pacific Sun.

Publications
“Creative Characters” Edited by Jan Middendorp, MyFonts. The Netherlands: BIS Publishers, 2010
“Indie Fonts 2” Edited by Richard Kegler, James Greishaber and Tamye Riggs. Buffalo, N.Y: P-Type Publications, 2003

External links

References

1941 births
Living people
American typographers and type designers